Nasir Valika (born 10 July 1955) is a Pakistani former first-class cricketer who played in 138 first-class cricket matches and 18 List A cricket matches between 1969-70 and 1983-84 for Kalat cricket team, Karachi cricket team, Sindh cricket team, and United Bank Limited cricket team.

References

External links

Pakistani cricketers
Living people
1955 births
Kalat cricketers
United Bank Limited cricketers
Sindh cricketers
Karachi cricketers
Place of birth missing (living people)